Iram of the Pillars (an alternative translation is Iram of the tentpoles), also called "Irum", "Irem", "Erum", "Ubar", or the "City of the pillars", is considered a lost city, region or tribe mentioned in the Quran.

Iram in the Quran
The Quran mentions Iram in connection with ‘imad (pillars): Surah al-Fajr (6-14)

There are several explanations for the reference to "Iram – who had lofty pillars". Some see this as a geographic location, either a city or an area, others as the name of a tribe. Those identifying it as a city have made various suggestions as to where or what city it was, ranging from Alexandria or Damascus to a city which actually moved or a city called Ubar. As an area, it has been identified with the biblical region known as Aram. It has also been identified as a tribe, possibly the tribe of ʿĀd, with the pillars referring to tent pillars. The Nabataeans were one of the many nomadic Bedouin tribes who roamed the Arabian Desert and took their herds to where they could find grassland and water. They became familiar with their area as the seasons passed, and they struggled to survive during bad years when seasonal rainfall decreased. Although the Nabataeans were initially embedded in the Aramean culture, theories that they have Aramean roots are rejected by modern scholars.  Instead, archaeological, religious and linguistic evidence confirms that they are a North Arabian tribe.

"The identification of Wadi Rum with Iram and the tribe of ʿĀd, mentioned in the Quran, has been proposed by scholars who have translated Thamudic and Nabataean inscriptions referring to both the place Iram and the tribes of ʿĀd and Thamud by name."

The mystic ad-Dabbagh has suggested that these verses refer to ʿĀd's tents with pillars, both of which are gold-plated. He claims that coins made of this gold remain buried and that Iram is the name of a tribe of ʿĀd and not a location.

Iram became widely known to Western literature with the translation of the story "The City of Many-Columned Iram and Abdullah Son of Abi Kilabah" in The Book of One Thousand and One Nights.

Archaeological research
The oldest mention of the city of Iram was found in the Ebla tablets, dated from c. 2500 BCE to c. 2250 BCE. In November 1991, the remains of a settlement were discovered in southern Oman which was hypothesized to be the legendary lost city destroyed by God. In 1992 Ranulph Fiennes wrote a book called Atlantis of the Sands about the expedition. The term Atlantis of the Sands had originally been coined by T. E. Lawrence.

Archaeologist Juris Zarins discussed Ubar in a 1996 NOVA interview:

By 2007, following further research and excavation, a study authored in part by Zarins could be summarised as follows:

 As far as the legend of Ubar was concerned, there was no evidence that the city had perished in a sandstorm. Much of the fortress had collapsed into a sinkhole that hosted the well, perhaps undermined by ground water being taken to irrigate the surrounding oasis.
 Rather than being a city, interpretation of the evidence suggested that "Ubar" was more likely to have been a region — the “Land of the Iobaritae” identified by Ptolemy. The decline of the region was probably due to a reduction in the frankincense trade caused by the Christianization of the Roman Empire, as Christianity did not require incense in the same quantities for its rituals. Also, it became difficult to find local labour to collect the resin. Climatic changes led to desiccation of the area, and sea transport became a more reliable way of transporting goods.

In fiction
Games

 Uncharted 3: Drake's Deception explores Iram of the Pillars in the city of Ubar.
 Dominions 5: Warriors of the Faith features Iram as the playable nation Ubar, a precursor to Na'Ba, which represents the Nabataeans.
 Sunless Sea has Irem as a port of call, the city having been transported underground to a subterranean ocean.
 Fallout 4 mentions Ubar and the Rub' al Khali by way of character Lorenzo Cabot.
 League of Legends features Icathia, a location in Runeterra, which seems to be based on the lost city as its lore references H. P. Lovecraft's "The Nameless City" and the Cthulhu Mythos in general.
 In Civilization VI, when the player captures the last city belonging to an AI Suleiman I, Suleiman exclaims "Ruin! Ruin! Istanbul has become Iram of the Pillars, remembered only by the melancholy poets."

Literature

 Edward FitzGerald's translation of the Rubaiyat of Omar Khayyam mentions Iram: "Iram indeed is gone with all its Rose," begins stanza V.
 H. P. Lovecraft places it somewhere near "The Nameless City" in his stories (1921). In "The Call of Cthulhu", Lovecraft uses the spelling Irem.
 Iram is the theme of Daniel Easterman's novel The Seventh Sanctuary (1987).
 Bayard Taylor's poem The Garden of Irem.
 Josephine Tey's novel The Singing Sands (1952) concerns, among other things, the search for the lost city of Wabar.
 James Rollins novel Sandstorm (2004) follows characters searching for the lost city of Ubar.
 In the SCP Foundation Wiki, SCP-001 (ROUNDERHOUSE's Gold Proposal) is about the lost Mekhanite city of Amoni-Ram based on Iram.

See also
 Hadramaut
 Al-Hijr Archaeological Site
 Arabian Desert
 Al-Ukhdud ("The Ditch", or a place near Najran)
 Babil (Babylon)
 Madyan (Midian)
 Ma'rib, Saba' (Sheba)
 Qahtanite
 Sodom and Gomorrah
 The town in Surah Ya-Sin
 Wabar craters

References

Further reading

External links
 Entry on Irem in Dan Clore's A Necronomicon Glossary
 
 
 
 
 
 

 
Arabian mythology
History of the Arabian Peninsula
Destroyed cities
Former populated places in Southwest Asia
One Thousand and One Nights
Lost ancient cities and towns
Quranic places
Mythological populated places